Per-Ola Ljung (born 7 November 1967) is an unattached Swedish football manager and former player.

Club career
Spending most of his career in his native Sweden, Ljung had a trial to forget for English side Watford in 1997. He made one appearance in the Football League Trophy; a 1–0 loss to Fulham.

References

External links 
 

1967 births
Living people
Swedish footballers
Helsingborgs IF players
Watford F.C. players
Landskrona BoIS players
Swedish football managers
Örebro SK managers
Place of birth missing (living people)
Association football defenders